Steptoe is a small unincorporated rural town in Whitman County, Washington, United States. Steptoe is 11 miles north of the county seat, Colfax and is 43 miles south of Spokane.

A post office called Steptoe was established in 1875. The community is named after Colonel Edward Steptoe for a battle located north of Steptoe near Rosalia, Washington.

References

Unincorporated communities in Whitman County, Washington
Unincorporated communities in Washington (state)